Jonathan Finn may refer to:
 Jon Finn (born 1958), an American rock musician and guitarist;
 Jonathan Finn OBE, British software developer and co-founder of Sibelius Software, a music software company and co-creator of Sibelius (software), a popular score-writing program